The 2023 Swiss federal election will be held on 22 October 2023 to elect all members of the National Council and Council of States of Switzerland. It will be followed by elections to the Federal Council, Switzerland's government and collegial presidency, on 13 December.

Timeline 
 Mid-october 2022: Official informations to the cantons and parties
 31 December 2022: Deadline for party registration
 1 March 2023: Publication of the candidacy deadlines for the National Council
 30 April: Landsgemeinde in Appenzell-Innerrhoden (Council of States election in the canton)
 1 May: Update of the party register
 August: Candidacy deadline for the National Council in the cantons using proportional representation
 September: Delivery of the electoral guide to the cantons
 4 September: Candidacy deadline for the cantons using majoritarian vote with possibility of walkover
 Late September: Delivery of the voting material
 22 October: Election day (National Council & 1st round for the Council of States)
 Late October: Publication of the official results
 4 December: Opening of the new National Council and oath
 13 December: Election of the Federal Council

Electoral system

National Council 
The 200 members of the National Council are elected from the 26 cantons, each of which constitutes a constituency. In all multi-member cantons open-list proportional representation is used; with apparentments for allied parties and sub-apparentments for lists within parties, where apparented lists are initially counted together for seats allocation. Seats are allocated using the Hagenbach-Bischoff system with no threshold. Voters may cross out names on party lists or write names twice, split their vote between parties (a system known as panachage), or draw up their own list on a blank ballot. The six single-member cantons use first-past-the-post voting.

Seats in the National Council are apportioned to the cantons based on their respective population size (which includes children and resident foreigners who do not have the right to vote). Based on the official population count recorded at the end of 2020, Basel-Stadt lost a seat while Zürich gained one. Zürich is the canton with the most seats (36).

The rules regarding who can stand as a candidate and vote in elections to the National Council are uniform across the Confederation. Only Swiss citizens aged at least 18 can stand or vote and the citizens resident abroad can register to vote in the canton in which they last resided (or their canton of citizenship, otherwise) and be able to vote no matter how long since, or whether they ever have, lived in Switzerland.

Council of States 
The 46 members of the Council of States are elected in 20 two-seat constituencies (representing the 20 'full' cantons) and six single-member constituencies (representing the six half-cantons). Two 'full' cantons with small populations — Uri and Glarus — have therefore each two seats in the Council of States but only one seat each in the much larger National Council.

Elections to the Council of States are regulated by the cantons. The cantons of Jura and Neuchâtel use proportional representation, while all the others use a majoritarian system, often with two rounds of voting. In the first round voters typically have up to two votes and candidates need an overall majority to be elected; if seats remain to be filled a runoff is held using simple plurality. All cantons—except Appenzell-Innerrhoden which elects its states councilors during the landsgemeinde in April—hold the first round concurrently with the National Council election, but the dates for the runoffs vary.

As each canton regulates its election to the Council of States, the rules regarding who can stand as a candidate and vote in these elections varies canton-by-canton. Jura and Neuchâtel allow certain foreign residents to vote, whilst Glarus allows 16- and 17-year-olds the vote. Swiss citizens abroad registered to vote in a canton are permitted to vote in that canton's Council of States election only if the canton's law allows it. Only Schaffhausen has compulsory voting, though limited in implementation by way of only an insignificant fine.

Contesting parties
The table below lists contesting parties represented in the Federal Assembly before the election.

Opinion polls

Graphical summary
The chart below depicts opinion polls conducted for the 2023 Swiss federal election; trendlines are local regressions (LOESS).

Vote share
Since 2021

2020

Notes

References

Federal elections in Switzerland
Switzerland
Federal 
Federal 
Switzerland